The brooding anemone, Halianthella annularis, is a species of sea anemone in the family Halcampidae,.

Description
The brooding anemone is a pale, fragile-looking anemone, having 24 long, transparent tentacles.

Distribution
It is found only around the South African coast, from Lamberts Bay to Cape Agulhas.

Ecology
This anemone is found subtidally down to at least 20m under water. It favours sheltered areas and overhangs.

Juveniles are brooded in a fold of the skin on the column of the parent.

References

Halcampidae
Animals described in 1938